Mirachelus is a genus of sea snails and marine gastropod mollusks in the family Chilodontaidae.

Species
Species within the genus Mirachelus include:
 Mirachelus acanthus Quinn, 1991
 Mirachelus clinocnemus Quinn, 1979
 Mirachelus corbis (Dall, 1889)
 Mirachelus galapagensis McLean, 1970
 Mirachelus urueuauau Absalao, 2009

References

 
Chilodontaidae
Gastropod genera